Education Sunday is a special day of prayer for all involved in any aspect of education held in the United Kingdom on the second Sunday  in September. For some years it was held on the ninth Sunday before Easter, however in 2016, after extensive consultation, it was moved to September to coincide with the start of the school year.

For more than 100 years there has been an annual recognition of Education Sunday held on an ecumenical basis in England and Wales.

Education Sunday is promoted by an ecumenical steering group in association with the Churches’ Joint Education Policy Committee. The ecumenical steering group comprises representatives from the following eight organisations:
Association of Christian Teachers
Baptist Union
Roman Catholic Church
Church of England National Society
Methodist Church of Great Britain
Student Christian Movement
Salvation Army
United Reformed Church.

References

Further Information
Education Sunday website

Christian Sunday observances
September observances
Holidays and observances by scheduling (nth weekday of the month)